Days Gone Bye could refer to:

"Days Gone Bye" (The Walking Dead), an episode of The Walking Dead
"Days Gone Bye" (comics), the first story arc of The Walking Dead comic book series